Warning: Do Not Play is a 2019 South Korean horror/mystery film starring Seo Yea-ji and Jin Seon-kyu.

Plot
Park Mi-jung (Seo Yea-ji), a rookie horror movie director, wanted to make her next movie. In the preparing process, she heard about a banned horror movie from 8 years ago, directed by Kim Jae-hyun (Jin Seon-kyu). Mi-jung decided to find out what happened in the past, expecting that it might give some inspiration for her upcoming movie.

Cast 
 Seo Yea-ji as Park Mi-jung
 Jin Seon-kyu as Kim Jae-hyun
 Kim Bo-ra as Kim Ji-soo.
 Cha Yup as Cha Kwang-bae.
 Ji Yoon-ho as Kim Joon-seo
 Jo Jae-young as Jo Young-min
 Seo Suk-kyu as Senior Colleague Kang
 Kim Jae-in as actress Mi-jung
 Yoon Jung-ro as Movie company producer
 Kim Mi-kyung as Professor in Film department (cameo)
 Nam Tae-boo as grilled clam restaurant Sung-Tae
 Shin So-I as audience member
 Cha Woo-jin as male college student

References

External links
 

2019 films
2019 horror films
2010s Korean-language films
South Korean horror films
South Korean mystery films
Shudder (streaming service) original programming
2010s South Korean films